"Mean-Eyed Cat" (or "Mean Eyed Cat") is a song written and originally recorded by Johnny Cash.

The song was recorded by Cash at Sun Records on July 30, 1955. Sun released it as a single (Sun 347, with "Port of Lonely Hearts" on the opposite side) in October 1960, which was the last Sun release by Cash as he left the label for Columbia a few years earlier.

Cash also made a completely revised cover of this song for his 1996 album Unchained (a Rick-Rubin produced follow-up to American Recordings.

Content

Charts

References 

Johnny Cash songs
1960 singles
Songs written by Johnny Cash
Sun Records singles
1955 songs